The Knights of Momus ("KoM") was founded in 1872 and was the second-oldest parading Old Line Krewe in New Orleans Carnival after the Mistick Krewe of Comus and is the third oldest krewe to continuously present a tableau ball, after the Twelfth Night Revelers in 1870. 

For over 100 years, the Momus parade was a fixture of the New Orleans Mardi Gras parade schedule, parading annually on the Thursday before Fat Tuesday.  Since Momus was the Greek god of mockery, the themes of Momus parades typically paid homage to the organization's namesake with irreverent humor and biting satire.  The 1877 parade theme, "Hades, A Dream of Momus," caused an uproar when it took aim at the Reconstruction government established in New Orleans after the Civil War.  Attempts at retribution by local authorities were largely unsuccessful due to the secrecy of the membership.

In 1991, New Orleans City Council member Dorothy Mae Taylor passed an ordinance that required social organizations, including Mardi Gras Krewes, to certify publicly that they did not discriminate on the basis of race, gender, handicap, or sexual orientation, in order to obtain parade permits and other public licensure.  In effect, the ordinance required these, and other, private social groups to desegregate.  Momus was one of three historic krewes (with the Mistick Krewe of 1857 and KoP of 1882) that withdrew from parading rather than comply.

Two federal courts later declared that the ordinance was an unconstitutional infringement on First Amendment rights of free association, and an unwarranted intrusion on the privacy of the groups subject to the ordinance. The Supreme Court refused to hear the city's appeal from this decision.  Nevertheless, the Momus parade never returned to the streets of New Orleans, although the group still conducts an annual bal masqué on the Thursday before Mardi Gras.

The Louisiana Literary and Debating Society a.k.a. The Louisiana Club
Much like The Pickwick Club was founded as the public facade of The Mistick Krewe, The Louisiana Literary and Debating Society was founded as the public facade of Knights of Momus. Unlike The Pickwick Club/Mistick Krewe relationship, the Knights of Momus and The Louisiana Club are still highly intact, much like the Stratford Club and the High Priests of Mithras. Unlike The Boston Club or The Pickwick Club, the Louisiana Club is completely closed, and will not admit anyone through its portals that is not a member. It is rumored most of the club is related.

Gallery

Floats and Costumes

Invitations

Bulletin

Parade

Program

Galveston
The Knights of Momus ("KOM") were a Mardi Gras society in Galveston, Texas, founded in 1871.  The original Knights of Momus went defunct around the time of World War II.  A new group was founded in the mid-1980s, and seeking to rekindle the spirit of the original group, adopted the Momus name. The group was named after the Greek god Momus.

See Also
Knights of Chaos
Twelfth Night Revelers
The Louisiana Club
Mistick Krewe
Mardi Gras in New Orleans

References

Mardi Gras in New Orleans